The European Formula Two Championship was a Formula Two motor racing series that was held between 1967–84. The races were held across Europe, and were contested both by drivers aiming to compete in Formula One in the future as well as current Formula One drivers wishing to practice. The series was sanctioned by the FIA, motorsport's world governing body.

In order to prevent the series being dominated by Formula One drivers, the grading system was introduced where successful Formula One drivers and recent Formula Two champions were not eligible to score championship points if they competed in a round of the European Formula Two Championship.

Towards the end of the series' life, the number of entrants diminished and declining interest meant that it was replaced by the Formula 3000 class following the 1984 season.

Champions

External links
 Formula 2 register